Walking into the Night is a novel from Olaf Olafsson about a man’s hidden past and the immutability of love and loss.

Synopsis
For twenty years Christian Benediktsson has led a quiet life as the butler to William Randolph Hearst, the greatest newspaper magnate in the world. His days are filled with the rituals of Hearst’s life and the demands of running a grand household. But in his most private thoughts and memories, he relives another life: once a husband and father in Iceland, he abandoned his family for an actress in New York, where his affair ended in death and financial ruin. Retreating from his previous existence, he ended up at Hearst’s castle in California. No one else knows the secret of the man he once was—husband, father, businessman, lover—and, ultimately, even he will choose to forget that this person ever existed.

Critical reception
“Olafsson tells the life story of William Randolph Hearst’s fictional butler – delftly and grippingly…Clear-eyed and captivating, Olafsson writes effortlessly, seemingly incapable of a dull paragraph or page. His people are real, period atmosphere and detail unobtrusively perfect, his novel a gem and a small masterpiece.” – Kirkus Review 

“An elegant and moving novel that knows, and shows, the value of tact, selection and economy.” – The Independent (UK)

References

External links
 Random House
 Olaf Olafsson's Official Website

2001 novels
Pantheon Books books
Icelandic novels